Raubenheimer is a surname. Notable people with the surname include:

Ben Raubenheimer, South African army officer
Brian Raubenheimer (born 1940), South African racing driver
Carl Raubenheimer (born 1983), South African cricketer
Davon Raubenheimer (born 1984), South African rugby union player
Marc Raubenheimer (1952–1983), South African pianist
Shaun Raubenheimer (born 1983), South African rugby union player